Adolphe de Leuven (29 September 1802 – 14 April 1884) was a French theatre director and a librettist. Also known as Grenvallet, and Count Adolph Ribbing.

He was the illegitimate son of Adolph Ribbing, who was involved in the assassination of Gustav III of Sweden in 1792, and Jeanne-Claude Billard. He took his name as a variation of that of his paternal grandmother, Eva Löwen.

He produced over 170 plays and librettos, with operatic settings by Adam including Le postillon de Lonjumeau, Clapisson, Félicien David (Le Saphir) and Thomas.

He was associated with the Opéra-Comique for fifty years and was director (with Eugène Ritt as administrator) from 1862 to 1870 and co-director with Camille du Locle from 1870-1874. He resigned in protest at the on-stage murder in Carmen.

References

External links

French opera librettists
French ballet librettists
19th-century French dramatists and playwrights
Writers from Paris
French people of Swedish descent
1802 births
1884 deaths